Ghost Ship is a contemporary worship music band from Seattle, Washington, United States. They are on the BEC Recordings label and Mars Hill Music. In 2013, the band released the critically acclaimed and commercially successful album entitled The Good King.

Background
In 2009, Ghost Ship formed at Mars Hill Church's Downtown Seattle campus in Seattle, Washington.  They were one of the worship bands at the church, alongside Ivan & Alyosha, Elysium, and Thunderoso.

Music
In 2013, the band was signed to BEC Recordings, when the partnership with Mars Hill Music took place.

A River with No End EP
On November 15, 2011, the EP with Mars Hill Music was released, which was the first EP by the band, but it never charted.

The Good King
On June 11, 2013, Ghost Ship released The Good King on BEC Recordings in association with Mars Hill Music. The Good King charted at No. 28 and No. 22 on the Top Christian Albums and the Top Heatseekers Albums charts respectively, for the Billboard charting week of June 29, 2013. The album garnered critical acclaim by music critics, which gave only one mixed review.

Costly
Their second studio album, Costly, was released on August 28, 2015, by BEC Recordings.

To the End
Their third studio album, To the End, was released on August 9, 2019, by BEC Recordings. The songs were written over a four year period of brokenness and healing, with each song accessing a different snapshot of God speaking into despair and providing hope.

Members

 Current
 Cam Huxford – vocals, guitars
 Shay Carlucci – piano, organ, vocals 
 Chae Choi – guitars
 Jamison Dewlen – banjo, dobro, pedal steel, guitars, percussion
 Doug Finefrock – drums

 Past
 Fancy Morales – percussion, vocals
 Keegan Williams – bass
 Matt Willis - bass
 Adam Bradley - keys
 Kelsey Schwichtenberg - bass
 Nathan Broyles - drums
 Gabe Martinez - drums
 Chris Bowden - guitar
 Steve Fox - percussion
 Nick Kramer - guitar
 Andrew Jacobson - piano

Discography

Studio albums

References

Musical groups established in 2009
Musical groups from Seattle
BEC Recordings artists